Jacob Weitering (born 23 November 1997) is an Australian rules footballer playing for the Carlton Football Club in the Australian Football League (AFL).

Early life
Weitering participated in the Auskick program at Mt Martha and played junior football for the Mount Martha Junior Football Club, before playing for the Dandenong Stingrays in the TAC Cup. He captained Victoria Country at the 2015 AFL Under 18 Championships, where he was selected in the under 18 All-Australian team.  He was a member of the NAB AFL Academy in 2014 and 2015, and was awarded the Ben Mitchell Medal in 2015, voted by his peers as the player who best represents the values important to the AFL Academy.

He was drafted with the first selection in the 2015 national draft by the Carlton Football Club.

AFL Career
Weitering made his debut in round 1, 2016 against Richmond. Weitering had a solid debut with 17 disposals and 7 marks. He was named the 2016 AFL Rising Star nominee for round 3 following an impressive display against the Gold Coast Suns in which he had 26 disposals and took nine marks.

After an impressive 2020 season, Weitering was awarded the John Nicholls Medal as Carlton’s best and fairest player of the season.

Three time All-Australian squad 2020, 2021, 2022

Statistics
Statistics are correct to the end of Round 23 2022

|- style="background-color: #EAEAEA"
! scope="row" style="text-align:center" | 2016
|style="text-align:center;"|
| 23 || 20 || 2 || 0 || 164 || 127 || 291 || 106 || 24 || 0.1 || 0.0 || 8.2 || 6.3 || 14.5 || 5.3 || 1.2
|-
! scope="row" style="text-align:center" | 2017
|style="text-align:center;"| 
| 23 || 22 || 7 || 3 || 198 || 103 || 301 || 122 || 28 || 0.3 || 0.1 || 9.0 || 4.7 || 13.7 || 5.5 || 1.3
|- style="background-color: #EAEAEA"
! scope="row" style="text-align:center" | 2018
|style="text-align:center;"|
| 23 || 14 || 1 || 0 || 127 || 62 || 189 || 82 || 22 || 0.1 || 0.0 || 9.1 || 4.4 || 13.5 || 5.9 || 1.6
|-
! scope="row" style="text-align:center" | 2019
|style="text-align:center;"|
| 23 || 20 || 0 || 0 || 199 || 65 || 264 || 115 || 29 || 0.0 || 0.0 || 10.0 || 3.3 || 13.2 || 5.8 || 1.5
|- style="background-color: #EAEAEA"
! scope="row" style="text-align:center" | 2020
|style="text-align:center;"|
| 23 || 17 || 0 || 1 || 146 || 42 || 188 || 74 || 17 || 0.0 || 0.0 || 8.5 || 2.4 || 11.0 || 4.3 || 1.0
|- style="background-color: #EAEAEA"
! scope="row" style="text-align:center" | 2021
|style="text-align:center;"|
| 23 || 22 || 0 || 1 || 301 || 60 || 361 || 167 || 29 || 0.0 || 0.0 || 13.6 || 2.7 || 16.4 || 7.5 || 1.3
|- style="background-color: #EAEAEA"
! scope="row" style="text-align:center" | 2022
|style="text-align:center;"|
| 23 || 18 || 1 || 0 || 169 || 47 || 216 || 109 || 16 || 0.0 || 0.0 || 9.3 || 2.6 || 12.0 || 6.0 || 0.8
|- class="sortbottom"
! colspan=3| Career
! 133
! 11
! 5
! 1304
! 506
! 1810
! 775
! 166
! 0.0
! 0.0
! 9.8
! 3.8
! 13.6
! 5.8
! 1.2
|}

References

External links

Living people
1997 births
Australian rules footballers from Victoria (Australia)
Dandenong Stingrays players
Carlton Football Club players